The cruzeiro real (plural: cruzeiros reais) was the short-lived currency of Brazil between August 1, 1993, and June 30, 1994. It was subdivided in 100 centavos; however, this unit was used only for accounting purposes, and the coins and banknotes still valid for cruzeiro between 10 and 500 cruzeiros were used for the purpose of corresponding to the cents of that coin, especially when the redenomination was carried out. The currency had the ISO 4217 code BRR.

This redenomination, at the beginning of the second half of 1993, was made with the objective of facilitating the accounting of day-to-day activities, which in the previous unit implied the placement of several zeros that made it difficult to record values ​​in calculators and machines. that issued tax coupons in an automated way at that time, with the objective that such relatively fragile systems would not present problems in the accounting of such values, especially in the rampant inflation in Brazil in the first half of the 1990s, the result of several unsuccessful economic plans and an economy whose inflationary sieve hid its unproductive bottlenecks.

The cruzeiro real was replaced with the current Brazilian real as part of the Plano Real.

History
The cruzeiro real replaced the third cruzeiro, with 1000 cruzeiros = 1 cruzeiro real. The cruzeiro real was replaced in circulation by the real at a rate of 1 real for 2750 cruzeiros reais. Before this occurred, the unidade real de valor (pegged to the U.S. dollar at parity) was used in pricing, to allow the population to become accustomed to a stable currency (after many years of high inflation) before the real was introduced.

Coins
Standard circulation stainless-steel coins were issued in 1993 and 1994 in denominations of 5, 10, 50 and 100 cruzeiros reais. The reverse of the coins portrayed iconic animals of the Brazilian fauna.

No commemorative coins were issued for the Cruzeiro Real.

The macaw and jaguar were represented again in the Real's  and  bills, respectively, after their introduction in 1994, and the maned wolf was later portrayed in the  bill since its introduction in late 2020.

Banknotes

In 1993, provisional banknotes were introduced in the form of cruzeiro notes overprinted in the new currency. These were in denominations of 50, 100 and 500 cruzeiros reais. Regular notes followed in denominations of 1000, 5000 and 50,000 cruzeiros reais. The 10,000 cruzeiros reais banknote was designed and scheduled to be put into circulation in the first months of 1994, but inflation and the impending release of a new economic plan put its release on hold and only the 50,000 Cruzeiro real banknote was released.

References

External links

cruzeiro real
Currencies introduced in 1993
1993 establishments in Brazil
1994 disestablishments in Brazil
1993 in Brazil
1994 in Brazil
1993 in economics
1994 in economics